Radulf of Barcelona was a Catholic Bishop of northern Spain between (about 885–942).
Born the  son of Count Wifred the Hairy and Guinidilda of Empúries. 

In 888 he was sent to the Monastery of Santa Maria de Ripoll  where he eventually became abbot, but left in 900.   He was consecrated bishop of Urgell in 914. As bishop he built several parish churches

References 

9th-century bishops in al-Andalus
Bishops of Urgell